Glypholecia is a genus of lichenized fungi in the family Acarosporaceae.

References

 

Acarosporales
Lichen genera
Lecanoromycetes genera
Taxa named by William Nylander (botanist)